Grapevine Mills is a shopping mall in Grapevine, Texas, United States, in the Dallas-Fort Worth metropolitan area.

Grapevine Mills opened on October 30, 1997, and is one of the largest malls owned by The Mills platform of Simon Property Group. The mall features over 20 anchors and over 200 specialty retailers, as well as a variety of theme restaurants, casual dining and cutting-edge entertainment venues.

Grapevine Mills is located within a major retail area just east of Lake Grapevine and two miles (3km) north of Dallas/Fort Worth International Airport. It has a racetrack floor plan and the AMC Dine-In Grapevine Mills 30.

It is the second-largest mall in Tarrant County, Texas, with North East Mall being largest.

History 
Grapevine Mills opened on October 30, 1997 as a joint venture between The Mills Corp. and Simon DeBartolo. It was one of the first malls to use the "Mills experience", which involved bringing in major department stores and outlet stores as anchors, as well as off-price retail chains and large stores that offer a wide range of products. Mills-owned malls also had "Entertainment Zones" that included restaurants, games, and movie theaters. In 1999, the Polar Ice rink opened at the mall.

In July 2002, Simon Property Group sold its shares in the mall. In November 2002, the ESPN X Games Skate Park opened at the mall. In January 2007, Mills Corp accepted a $1.35 billion buyout offer from Brookfield Management. The following month, Simon Property Group offered $1.6 billion for the company and Mills accepted the higher offer. As part of the acquisition, Simon Property Group took over the 38 malls owned by the Mills Corp. at the time, including Grapevine Mills.

Legoland 
In 2009, Grapevine Mills Mall owner Simon Property Group announced that Merlin Entertainments would add a Legoland Discovery Center inside the mall. It opened on March 25, 2011, with  inside the space that had housed Woodward Skatepark. Lego-themed attractions included an interactive laser ride, a 3D movie and a play area for kids. In October 2011, the city council approved an expansion of Legoland at the mall.

Aquarium 
In May 2010, the mall announced plans to build the Sea Life Grapevine Aquarium. It was constructed across from the new Legoland in the former space of the GameWorks video game arcade. It opened on July 12, 2011. At the time of opening, the aquarium had over 30 displays, a 160,000 gallon tank with a tunnel for guests to walk through and a tide pool where visitors could interact with certain animals.

Renovation
In 2012, the city of Grapevine approved $14 million for renovations of the mall. The mall's new look was based on the newly renovated Opry Mills mall in Nashville. Renovations began were completed in 2016. New stores were added, such as Michael Kors, Under Armour, Coach, and H&M.

2017–present 
In January 2017, FieldhouseUSA, an indoor sports facility, opened at Grapevine Mills. In February 2019, the first Peppa Pig World of Play store in the United States opened at Grapevine Mills. On July 7, 2020, it was announced that Neiman Marcus Last Call would be closing permanently. On May 11, 2022, Meow Wolf announced that a new experience would open in the mall.

Department stores and anchors
AMC Dine-In Grapevine Mills 30
American Freight
Burlington Coat Factory
Camille La Vie
The Children's Place (formerly located in a smaller  location)
Forever 21
Fieldhouse USA
H&M
Legoland Discovery Centre
Lunar Mini Golf
Marshalls
Neiman Marcus Last Call
Nike Factory Store
Off Broadway Shoe Warehouse
Old Navy
Rainforest Cafe
Ross Dress for Less 
Round One
Off 5th Saks Fifth Avenue
Sea Life Grapevine Aquarium
Sun & Ski Sports
VF Outlet

Former department stores and anchors 

 Woodward Skatepark: became Legoland Discovery Center
 ESPN X Games Skatepark: became Woodward Skatepark
 Jekyll & Hyde Club: became ESPN X Games Skatepark
 GameWorks: became Sea Life Grapevine Aquarium
 Just for Feet: became Nike Factory Store
 Off Rodeo Drive Beverly Hills: became Forever 21
 The Sports Authority (closed in August 2016 with liquidation of Chapter 11 Bankruptcy)
 Steve & Barry's(closed beginning of 2009 with liquidation of chain)
 Virgin Megastore (closed 2009)
 Western Warehouse (closed in 2009 with liquidation of chain)
 Dick Clark's American Bandstand Grill
 Dr Pepper Starcenter: now Round One
 JCPenney Outlet Store (closed in 2013, became Fieldhouse USA)
 Bed Bath & Beyond

See also 

Katy Mills
North East Mall
List of shopping malls in the Dallas/Fort Worth Metroplex

Notes

External links
 Grapevine Mills

Grapevine, Texas
Shopping malls in the Dallas–Fort Worth metroplex
Outlet malls in the United States
Simon Property Group
Shopping malls established in 1997
Buildings and structures in Tarrant County, Texas
Tourist attractions in Tarrant County, Texas
1997 establishments in Texas